Skjær i sjøen (Obstacles) is a Norwegian romantic drama film from 1965 directed by Knut Andersen. The film is about an aging author that has retired to a deserted place in Southern Norway. He is divorced and burdened by his own problems. When his cheerful teenage daughter and two of her friends come to visit, the spark gradually returns to his life. The main roles are played by Henki Kolstad, Tone Danielsen, Solfrid Heier, and Kai Remlov. It is based on Arthur Omre's short story "Sensommer" (Indian Summer).

Plot
The aging and divorced author Johannes Mørk relives youth's intoxicating infatuation when his teenage daughter Eva, together with two young friends, sweeps into his lazy southern idyll. Mørk has long revolved around his own problems and guilt over his failed marriage. He has unconsciously been about to stagnate into a dull habit and just let old age come. Lone, one of his daughter's girlfriends, makes a strong impression on him, and soon something begins to develop between them. Both the eccentric and the dour person in him have begun to stand out, but with his daughter's girlfriend in his focus, new feelings awaken in Johannes Mørk. This awakening leads him to resume his relationship with his ex-wife. This also affects his daughter Eva, who has been afraid to commit because she is the child of a divorce.

Music
"Åh – for en dag!" (melody: Egil Monn-Iversen, lyrics: Bjørn Sand), released as the single Nor-Disc NOR 118 by Winnie (Solfrid Heier) and others in 1965
"Minnene fra i fjor" (melody: Egil Monn-Iversen, lyrics: Knut Andersen and Bjørn Sand), released on the same single as above
"Sjøen har mange skjær" (melody: Egil Monn-Iversen, lyrics: Bjørn Sand).
"De evige tre" (melody: Walter Schrøder, lyrics: Tove Ditlevsen)

Cast

Henki Kolstad as Johannes Mørk, an author
Tone Danielsen as Eva Mørk, Johannes' daughter
Solfrid Heier as Lone 
Wenche Sandnæs as Marit 
Kai Remlov as Carsten, Eva's boyfriend  
Carl Henrik Størmer as Einar, Lone's boyfriend
John Andreassen as Kalle, Marit's boyfriend
Synnøve Gleditsch as Mrs. Ås, Marit's mother 
Kjell Hofstad as the mailman

References

External links 
 
 Skjær i sjøen at the National Library of Norway
 Skjær i sjøen at Filmfront

1965 films
1960s Norwegian-language films
Norwegian romantic drama films
Films directed by Knut Andersen
Films based on short fiction
1965 romantic drama films